Camillo Casarini (August 8, 1830 in Bologna – April 21, 1874 in Bologna) was an Italian politician and patriot, collaborating with Cavour.
In 1865 he was elected to the National Parliament. In that period he developed a progressive estrangement from the political right and adhered to the nascent constitutional Left, calling for the birth of a grand progressive national party. In July 1869 he won the administrative elections in Bologna and became mayor at the head of a coalition of forces that took the name of Partito degli azzurri (Blue Party).  
His archive can be seen at the Museo civico del Risorgimento di Bologna.

External links
 

1830 births
1874 deaths
Politicians from Bologna